This is a list of supernovae that are of historical significance. These include supernovae that were observed prior to the availability of photography, and individual events that have been the subject of a scientific paper that contributed to supernova theory.

An alternative, complete and updated list can be found in the Open Supernova Catalog. Recent supernovae can be found at Latest Supernovae.

List

In most entries, the year when the supernova was seen is part of the designation (1st column).

See also
 List of most distant supernovae
 List of supernova candidates
 List of supernova remnants
 Lists of astronomical objects

References

Further reading

External links
List of all known supernovae at The Open Supernova Catalog.
IAU Supernovae on the Transient Name Server (TNS)
Supernovae through 2015 at IAU Central Bureau for Astronomical Telegrams (CBAT).
WISeREP - The Weizmann Interactive Supernova data Repository

Supernovae
Supernovae